The Agawam Diner is an historic diner at 166 Newburyport Turnpike (U.S. Route 1) in Rowley, Massachusetts.  It was manufactured in 1954 and moved to this location in 1970 after first being in Ipswich.  It is the town's only diner and one of only six in the state manufactured by the Fodero Dining Car Company.  It was listed on the National Register of Historic Places in 1999.

Description
It is a single-story building, six bays wide and seven deep. Its exterior is finished with a combination of horizontal and vertical metal banding and has rounded corners. At the center of its main facade is a projecting entry vestibule with entrances at the sides. The stairs leading to the entrances are sheltered by removable canvas awnings. The interior is divided roughly in half, the front half housing the dining and service area and the rear the kitchen. The dining area includes booths along the front wall and stools at the counter separating the dining and service areas.

History
The Galanis family opened a diner on this site in 1947, in a structure manufactured by the Worcester Lunch Car Company.  It was one of three locations operated by the Galanises; the others were in Ipswich (opened 1940) and Peabody.  In 1954, the Galanises purchased two diners from the Fodero Dining Car Company of Bloomfield, New Jersey.  One was placed at Ipswich, replacing a Worcester diner the family sold, and the other was placed in Peabody.  The Peabody diner closed in 1960, and the Ipswich one in 1970.  The Galanises then opted to sell the diner at Rowley and moved the Ipswich diner to its location.

The diner is named for a local Indian tribe.

See also
 List of diners
 National Register of Historic Places listings in Essex County, Massachusetts

References

Commercial buildings completed in 1954
Restaurants on the National Register of Historic Places in Massachusetts
Buildings and structures in Rowley, Massachusetts
Tourist attractions in Essex County, Massachusetts
Diners in Massachusetts
Diners on the National Register of Historic Places
Restaurants established in 1940
National Register of Historic Places in Essex County, Massachusetts
U.S. Route 1